Tetyana Mykolayivna Dorokhova is a Ukrainian archer who competed at the 2012 Summer Olympics in the women's team event and the women's individual event. She won the silver medal at the 2011 Archery European Indoor Championships in the women's team event.

References

External links
 

Ukrainian female archers
1985 births
Living people
Olympic archers of Ukraine
Archers at the 2012 Summer Olympics
Universiade medalists in archery
Universiade silver medalists for Ukraine
Medalists at the 2003 Summer Universiade
Medalists at the 2009 Summer Universiade
Medalists at the 2011 Summer Universiade
Sportspeople from Chernivtsi
21st-century Ukrainian women